Michael Sullivan (February 13, 1838 – January 26, 1915) was a Canadian physician, professor, and politician.

Born in Killarney, County Kerry, Ireland, Sullivan came to Canada in 1842 and settled in Kingston, Ontario. He was educated at the Regiopolis College and received an M.D. in 1858 from Queen's College. He served as Purveyor-General during the North-West Rebellion of 1885. In 1872 he was appointed Lecturer in Anatomy in Queen's College, and at the time of the establishment of the Royal College of Physicians and Surgeons of Canada in affiliation with Queen's University, he was appointed Professor of Anatomy. In 1883 he was President of the Canadian Medical Association, and was an Alderman from 1863 to 1873 and Mayor of Kingston from 1874 to 1875. He later became a Professor of Surgery and Histology, and was a trustee of the Kingston Hospital and a member of the Ontario Medical Association. He ran unsuccessfully for the House of Commons of Canada in the 1882 election for Kingston. He was appointed to the Senate on the advice of John Alexander Macdonald in January 1885 representing the senatorial division of Kingston, Ontario. A Conservative, he served for almost 28 years until resigning in 1912.

References

External links
 

1838 births
1915 deaths
Canadian senators from Ontario
Conservative Party of Canada (1867–1942) candidates for the Canadian House of Commons
Conservative Party of Canada (1867–1942) senators
Irish emigrants to pre-Confederation Ontario
Mayors of Kingston, Ontario
Politicians from County Kerry
Queen's University at Kingston alumni
Academic staff of the Queen's University at Kingston
Immigrants to the Province of Canada